Stanley Walter Croucher Pack CBE (1904–1977) was an officer in the Royal Navy, and an author of several books related to maritime topics.

In 1928, while an instructor Commander at Dartmouth Naval College, he wrote a meteorology textbook entitled The Frequency Departure of Thermionic Oscillators from the L. C. Valve.  Decades later he wrote a book about the college, entitled Britannia at Dartmouth.

In 1953 the London Gazette reported he had been promoted from Instructor Commander to Instructor Captain.

Pack was one of the UK representatives when the World Meteorological Organization's subcommittees, the Commission for Instruments and Methods of Observation, when it met in Toronto, in August 1953.

In 1957 he was made a Commander of the Order of the British Empire.

Bibliography

References

1904 births
1977 deaths
Royal Navy officers
British meteorologists
World Meteorological Organization people
Commanders of the Order of the British Empire
British officials of the United Nations